Angelyne is the debut studio album by American singer and billboard model Angelyne, released as a limited edition picture disc in 1982 by Erika Records. It was her first album released under her name after fronting the band Baby Blue. She collaborated with Jordan Michaels, Dale Carroll and Leonard Johnson. Angelyne is a rock album influenced by new wave music. It features a cover version of Elvis Presley's song "(Let Me Be Your) Teddy Bear".

As a promotion for the album, number of bus shelter posters and flyers were put up in the area of Los Angeles. First assumed by Angelyne's then-boyfriend, manager and guitar player in her band Baby Blue, Jordan Michaels, her poster campaign was taken up in 1982 by the owner of billboard print company, Hugo Maisnik. Maisnik later expanded her self-promoting venture by putting large billboards of her around the city which made Angelyne famous and caused her to be proclaimed the "Billboard Queen of Los Angeles".

"Kiss Me L.A." was released as a single from the album and received a moderate airplay on local radio stations. A song entitled "Lee Ann Love" was intended to be included on the album but didn't appear on the final release. Angelyne has been musically compared to Berlin, Missing Persons and Kim Wilde.

Track listing

Credits and personnel
Angelyne – vocals
Jordan Michaels – producer, guitar, arrangements
Dale Carroll – producer, arrangements
Leonard Johnson – producer
David Dalessandro – drums
Peter Christian – drums
John Stanbridge – drums
Susan Rogers – engineer
John Banuelos – engineer

Credits adapted from the album's liner notes.

References

External links 
 

1982 debut albums
Angelyne albums